ETIM may refer to:
 East Turkestan independence movement, a political movement seeking an independent East Turkestan
Turkistan Islamic Party, formerly known as the East Turkestan Islamic Movement, an Islamic extremist organization founded in Western China
 ETIM (standard), a classification system for electrical and electronic products